Paolo Cecconi (Scandicci, 11 June 1953 – Empoli, 15 November 2016) was an Italian footballer. He played as a goalkeeper.

He played his entire career for A.C. Prato in Serie C1 or lower division. Besides football, Paolo liked painting and jazz music.

He died of a heart attack on 15 November 2016.

Career
1971–1983 Prato 258 (0)

References

External links
 Campionato 1976/77, Serie D, girone E

1953 births
Living people
Italian footballers
A.C. Prato players
Association football defenders